Fulidhoo Kandu is the channel to the south of South Male' Atoll and to the north of Vaavu Atoll of the Maldives.

References
 Divehiraajjege Jōgrafīge Vanavaru. Muhammadu Ibrahim Lutfee. G.Sōsanī.

Channels of the Maldives
Channels of the Indian Ocean